Saint Giles Island is the largest in a group of small islands off the northeast tip of Tobago. It is very steep sided and hosts tropical dry forest and wind-swept littoral scrub.

At least five species of reptiles have been recorded for the island. One is a snake - Boddaert's tropical racer (Mastigodryas boddaerti), and four are lizards - Green iguanas, Turnip-tailed geckos, Ocellated geckos (Gonatodes ocellatus), and an unidentified species of skink in the sub-family Mabuyinae.

See also
 Islands of Trinidad and Tobago

References

Islands of Trinidad and Tobago
Geography of Tobago